Street of Women is a 1932 pre-Code romantic drama directed by Archie Mayo and starring Kay Francis and Roland Young.

Plot summary

A man's affair complicates his daughter's love life.

Cast
 Kay Francis as Natalie "Nat" Upton
 Roland Young as Linkhorne "Link" Gibson
 Alan Dinehart as Larry Baldwin
 Gloria Stuart as Doris "Dodo" Baldwin
 Marjorie Gateson as Lois Baldwin
 Allen Vincent as Clarke Upton
 Adrienne Dore as Frances
 Louise Beavers as Mattie

References

External links
 
 
 
 

American romantic drama films
American black-and-white films
Films based on American novels
Films directed by Archie Mayo
Warner Bros. films
1932 romantic drama films
1932 films
1930s American films